Stafford Common is home to Garden Village Football Club, based in the village of Kingsbridge in the west of Swansea.

Pitches
There are three full size pitches, one of them used by the two senior teams who play in the Welsh Football League (first team in Division 2 and the second team in Reserve Division West).

The other two pitches are used by the two senior teams who play in the Carmarthenshire League (third team in Division 1 and fourth team in Reserve Division 1) as well as the Junior sides and Swansea City Ladies.

The main pitch at Stafford Common is also used to host local and regional cup ties, including finals. And in September 2010 it hosted its first ever international - Wales women's Under-17 side beat Belgium 1–0 to register their first ever win at that level.

Facilities
There is a clubhouse at the ground situated between the car park and the changing room facility, which consists of a bar, plasma television screen, a pool table and plenty of seating.

The changing rooms were opened in July 2005 by the President of the club, Mr. Jack Thomas. There are four full-size changing rooms available to cater for two matches at a time, a treatment room and disabled toilet facilities are also available.

New floodlights have been added to Stafford Common in January 2011. This is a major development and has been eagerly anticipated for years.

References

Football venues in Wales
Sports venues in Swansea
Stadiums in Swansea
Sports venues completed in 1922
Garden Village A.F.C.